Jerome Liebling (April 16, 1924 Manhattan, New York – July 27, 2011 Northampton, Massachusetts) was an American photographer, filmmaker, and teacher. The documentary filmmaker Ken Burns, who studied with him at Hampshire College, called Liebling his mentor, and used one of Liebling's photographs on the cover of his 2022 book Our America: A Photographic History.

Liebling left his studies at Brooklyn College in 1942 to serve in the armed forces in Europe and North Africa during World War II. After the war, he returned to Brooklyn College to study art and design under Walter Rosenblum and Ad Reinhardt. In 1947, he joined New York's famed Photo League where he studied with Paul Strand. For two years he taught classes, showed his work in group exhibitions and served as membership secretary on the League's executive committee. In 1948, he studied motion-picture production at New School for Social Research and worked as a documentary filmmaker.

While a professor of film and photography at the University of Minnesota, Liebling began a longtime collaborative relationship with filmmaker Allen Downs; together they produced several award-winning documentaries, including Pow Wow, The Tree Is Dead, and The Old Men.

Liebling received numerous awards and grants, including two Guggenheim Fellowships, a National Endowment for the Arts Photographic Survey Grant, and a fellowship from the Massachusetts Council on the Arts. His photographs are in the permanent collections of many museums, including the Museum of Modern Art in New York, the Boston Museum of Fine Arts, the Fogg Museum in Cambridge, Massachusetts, the Corcoran Gallery of Art in Washington, D.C., The Jewish Museum in New York, and the National Gallery of Canada in Ottawa.

Liebling was a professor emeritus of Hampshire College.  He was the younger brother of David Liebling and Stan Liebling, and he is the father of five children, including Minnesota politician Tina Liebling and film director/producer Rachel Liebling.

References

External links
 Official Website
Photographs by Jerome Liebling
 Minneapolis Institute of Arts
 1997 Interview with Jerome Liebling
 2011 Interview with Jerome Liebling
 
 Political Landscape: Jerome Liebling's Minnesota Capitol Photographs, 1956 – 1969
Obituary, Daily Hampshire Gazette
Obituary, Star Tribune
Obituary, NY Times: Lens Blog
Obituary, NY Times: Art & Design
Obituary, The Boston Globe
Person, Place, Thing interview

20th-century American photographers
1924 births
2011 deaths
21st-century American photographers
Brooklyn College alumni
United States Army personnel of World War II
University of Minnesota faculty
Hampshire College faculty
Photographers from New York City
People from Manhattan